Lee Gannon (born 2000) is an Irish hurler and Gaelic footballer who plays for Dublin Championship club Whitehall Colmcille. He has also appeared at inter-county level as a dual player with Dublin. He usually lines out as a corner back for the Dublin senior football team and Centre back for Whitehall Colmcille.

Career

A member of the Whitehall Colmcille club in Dublin, Gannon first came to prominence at schools' level as captain of the combined Dublin North team that won the Leinster Colleges Championship in 2018. He made his first appearance on the inter-county scene as a member of the Dublin minor team during the 2017 Leinster Championship, before later lining out as a dual player with the Dublin under-20 teams and has won Leinster Under-20 Championship titles in both codes. Gannon joined the Dublin senior hurling team in 2019 before finding inclusion with the Dublin senior football team in 2021.

Honours

Dublin North
Leinster Colleges Senior Hurling Championship: 2018

Dublin
Leinster Under-20 Hurling Championship: 2020
Leinster Under-20 Football Championship: 2020

References

External links
Lee Gannon profile at the Dublin GAA website

2000 births
Living people
Dual players
Dublin inter-county hurlers
Dublin inter-county Gaelic footballers
Whitehall Colmcille hurlers
Whitehall Colmcille Gaelic footballers
People educated at St Aidan's C.B.S.
Alumni of Dublin City University